"New Age Girl" is a song by alternative rock trio Deadeye Dick, from their debut album A Different Story and the soundtrack to the 1994 film Dumb and Dumber.

Its use in Dumb and Dumber widened the song's popularity. It peaked at #27 on the Billboard Hot 100 chart in January 1995 and remains the group's most well-known song. It was also their only top 40 hit, ensuring their one-hit wonder status.

Background
"New Age Girl" originated from a riff that Caleb Guillotte thought of in the shower. After being recorded on a cassette alongside four other songs, the track became a local radio hit, prompting Ichiban Records to sign the band. Clive Davis of Arista Records attempted to sign the band afterwards and rerecord "New Age Girl," but the band decided against it.

The song features lyrics about a socially conscious vegetarian girl named Mary Moon, with the infamous lyric "She don't eat meat, but she sure likes the bone." (Some radio stations aired an edited version of the song that obscured the word "bone".) Guillotte has said of the song:

Release
"New Age Girl" was released on the band's 1994 debut album, A Different Story. The song then appeared in the comedy film Dumb and Dumber and was released by RCA as the first single from the soundtrack. RCA also created a video for the song, which featured pumpkin-headed people running on a farm. The song peaked at number 27 on the Billboard Hot 100.

"New Age Girl" was ultimately the band's only hit, with many labeling the band a one-hit wonder. Caleb Guillotte later reflected that, had the song not been a hit, "Maybe people would have been more prepared to think of us as the 'cool' band. There's all sorts of woulda, coulda, shoulda's. But we were very fortunate. Even if we didn't get to live out some sort of permanent rock 'n' roll dream, we got a nice ride." Guillotte ultimately concluded, "There's so much in my life after Deadeye Dick that was benefitted positively by the fact that Deadeye Dick had a hit song."

In 2021, Deadeye Dick released a 2003 re-recording of "New Age Girl" after the original version of the song was made unavailable on streaming services, including Spotify and Apple Music, because of rights issues resulting from the 1999 bankruptcy of Ichiban Records.

References

1994 debut singles
1994 songs
Vegetarian-related mass media
Deadeye Dick (band) songs